Robin Juhkental (born 20 May 1988 in Tallinn, Estonia) is an Estonian singer. He is the frontman of Malcolm Lincoln.

Juhkental has studied in Kivimäe põhikool and Tallinna Nõmme Gümnaasium. He has also studied road engineering in Tallinn University of Applied Sciences.

Juhkental has never taken any singing lessons. He has participated in the Kaks takti ette (2007) and Eesti otsib superstaari (2009) television shows as a contestant. Malcolm Lincoln, together with a group of backing vocalists called Manpower 4, won the competition Eesti Laul 2010 with the song "Siren" and represented Estonia in the Eurovision Song Contest 2010. He also participated in Eesti Laul 2015 with the song "Troubles", which went to the finals. In 2023, he participated in Eesti Laul again with the song "Kurbuse matused" but finished in last place in the second semi-final and wasn't selected in the second chance round, therefore not qualifying for the final.

Juhkental uses a surrealist way of writing song lyrics: first he just babbles, records the nonsense and then starts thinking what words these sounds resemble. His lyrics are mostly in English. He believes that he is not a good enough poet to write lyrics in Estonian, but considers English to be so messy that lyrics written in it will seem less bad than they would in Estonian.

References

External links
"Robin Juhkental Eurovisioni ei karda ja võistlust üle ei hinda" – interview with Eesti Päevaleht, 30 April 2010

Eurovision Song Contest entrants for Estonia
Eurovision Song Contest entrants of 2010
1988 births
Living people
21st-century Estonian male singers
Estonian pop singers
Singers from Tallinn
Eesti Laul winners